Žeževica is a village in central Dalmatia, Croatia with a population of 350 (2011). It is located in the municipality of Šestanovac, 15 km from the Adriatic Sea.

The community has a Mediterranean climate, and the streets are lined with stone houses and historic structures. The village's main landmark is the Church of St. George, built in 1776, which is located on a natural landmark, a hill named Orje.

Žeževica is situated at the base of the Biokovo mountain. A short distance from Žeževica are some of the biggest Croatian tourist centers: Brela, Baška Voda and Makarska. Nearby is a river, the Cetina, which is a popular destination for rafting.

The village is mostly Roman Catholic.

The village is divided into two parts: Upper and Lower Žeževica.

In November 2005, a construction project was begun to build the Šestanovac-Ploče subsection of the Split-Dubrovnik highway, passing through Lower Žeževica. By the end of 2008. highway is opened.

References

Populated places in Split-Dalmatia County